Maria Velluti (1827–1891), was a Portuguese-born Brazilian stage actor and singer. 

She made her stage debut on the royal theatre in Lisbon in 1845. In 1847, she emigrated to Brazil, where she was engaged as a singer and actress. She played an important role in the mid 19th-century theatre life of Brazil, both as a stage artist as well as a translator of plays, representing the strong Portuguese influence prevalent in Brazilian theatre at the time. She married the theatre manager and actor Joaquim Augusto Ribeiro de Sousa.

References 

1827 births
1891 deaths
19th-century Portuguese actresses
19th-century Brazilian actresses